Pierre Ernou, known as "le chevalier Ernou", was a French painter.  He was born in Angers in 1685 and died in 1739.  Little is known of his life, save that he was the son of the patiner Jean Ernou, and that he passed much of his career in the French provinces.  He is known, however, to have been in Paris and in Lyon at points during his career.

References
Les Maîtres retrouvés - peintures françaises du XVIIe siècle du musée des Beaux-Arts d'Orléans, Paris, Somogy, 2002, p. 167.

17th-century French painters
French male painters
18th-century French painters
People from Angers
1685 births
1739 deaths
18th-century French male artists